Moraxella pluranimalium is a Gram-negative, aerobic, catalase- and oxidase-positive, non-spore-forming bacterium in the genus  Moraxella, which was isolated from the nasal turbinate of a pig.

References

External links
Type strain of Moraxella pluranimalium at BacDive -  the Bacterial Diversity Metadatabase

Moraxellaceae
Bacteria described in 2009